The 2013 Wimbledon Championships Men's Singles final was the championship tennis match of the Men's Singles tournament at the 2013 Wimbledon Championships. A significant part of the Djokovic–Murray rivalry, it pitted the world's top two players, Novak Djokovic and Andy Murray, against each other in a Grand Slam final for the fourth time.

After three hours and nine minutes, second seeded Murray defeated World No. 1 Djokovic 6–4, 7–5, 6–4 to win the match. By winning the 2013 Wimbledon Championships, Murray became the first British man since Fred Perry in 1936 to win the Wimbledon title and the first Scottish man since Harold Mahony in 1896 to win the title. The match was watched by a peak television audience of 17.3 million in the UK on BBC One. In the United States, ratings dropped 35% from the 2012 final when Roger Federer defeated Murray, making it the second least watched final since 1996 (only ahead of 2010).

Background

The match took place on the final day of the 2013 edition of the 13-day Wimbledon Championships, held every June and July. These two players had been heavily favoured to meet in the final following the early round defeats of Rafael Nadal, Roger Federer and Jo-Wilfried Tsonga, among others. Novak Djokovic was the top seed despite not being the defending champion, and was going for a second title at Wimbledon after winning in 2011, whilst Andy Murray, the second seed, was going for his first title after finishing runner-up to Federer the previous year. Both players had made it through their first four matches in straight sets, and both had to overcome tough five-set matches to make the final: Murray against Fernando Verdasco in the quarter-finals, against whom he dropped the first two sets, and Djokovic against Juan Martín del Potro, where he defeated the Argentine in the longest men's singles semifinal in Wimbledon history at the time, clocking in at 4 hours and 43 minutes.

Match
Andy Murray won the pre-match coin toss and chose ends, Novak Djokovic elected to serve first. Andy Murray then tested his serve early, earning three break points before Djokovic reeled off five consecutive points to take the opening game of the match. Murray then broke to take a 2–1 lead, but was immediately broken right back, after which Murray broke again to take a 4–3 lead. From there, neither player managed to break again in that set, with Murray serving out the set to love to take the first set 6–4.

Djokovic then started to make a comeback as he broke to take a 4–1 lead in the second set, though Murray then won the next three games to level the set at 4–4. Murray broke once again at 6–5 and once again served an ace on set point to win the second set 7–5 and thus go two sets up.

Murray then broke early to take a 2–0 lead in the third set, but then Djokovic won four games in a row to lead 4–2 on serve. Murray then broke again to keep the set on serve, and then held his subsequent service game to level the set at 4–all. Murray once again broke to take a 5–4 lead, thus putting himself in a strong position to serve for the championship. Murray served out to gain three championship points, but Djokovic saved all of them, thus forcing deuce. Djokovic then earned three separate break points, but Murray saved them all, the first through a huge first serve, the second through a cross-court forehand winner and the third through a forehand volley winner. Murray then earned a fourth championship point, which he converted after Djokovic netted a backhand to conclude the contest.

Murray thus became the first British man since Fred Perry to win the Wimbledon men's singles title. Djokovic, meanwhile, missed his chance to win a second Wimbledon title after his victory over Rafael Nadal in 2011.

Officials
The chair umpire throughout the match was the Swedish official Mohamed Lahyani. He had previously umpired the record-breaking Isner–Mahut match at the 2010 Wimbledon Championships.

Statistics

Source

Murray and Djokovic about the match

Andy Murray said after the match that he could not believe that he had won Wimbledon:

Novak Djokovic conceded that Murray was the better player on the day, and that he deserved the title:

Murray's Wimbledon victory ranked as one of the greatest drought breakers in world sport.

Reaction
Murray's Wimbledon victory was met with a positive reaction around Great Britain.

Tim Henman said he was delighted to finally see Murray end Britain's 77-year wait for a home-grown male Wimbledon Champion:

Prime Minister of the United Kingdom, David Cameron, the Queen, Sir Chris Hoy, Fred Perry's daughter, Penny, Mayor of London Boris Johnson, WTA players Laura Robson and Victoria Azarenka, and Scotland's First Minister, Alex Salmond, were also among those who paid tribute.

Additionally, BBC Sport writer Tom Fordyce hailed Andy Murray's Wimbledon victory as "the 'holy grail' for British sport".

Murray's Wimbledon victory dominated most of the British newspapers. It also even made front-page headlines on Serbia's two biggest newspapers, Blic and Politika, and also dominated the sports sections of The New York Times in the United States and Australia's Sydney Morning Herald.

See also
Djokovic–Murray rivalry
2012 US Open – Men's singles final
2016 French Open – Men's singles final

References

External links
 Andy Murray vs. Novak Djokovic: Wimbledon final as it happened, BBC SPORT
 Match Statistics, official Wimbledon website
 Match details, official ATP site
 Player Head to Head, official ATP site
 Extended highlights on YouTube

2013 Wimbledon Championships
Andy Murray tennis matches
Novak Djokovic tennis matches
2013